"Treehouse of Horror XXIX" is the 643rd episode of the American animated television series The Simpsons, the fourth episode of season 30 and the twenty-ninth "Treehouse of Horror" episode. It was released on October 21, 2018.

Plot

Opening sequence
The episode starts in Fogburyport, birthplace of Green Clam Chowder. The Simpson family arrive there because a book stated it's a place to visit before they mysteriously disappear.

However, it was revealed to be a trap and that they will be devoured by Cthulhu. However, Homer states that he was promised an oyster eating contest against Cthulhu, and Homer beats him. Cthulhu pukes and asks what Homer wants as a reward. Homer whispers "I want to eat you."

Cthulhu is seen in a giant cooking pot and the Simpsons (except Lisa) enjoy a hot dog made of Cthulhu's tentacles.

Homer then pokes Cthulhu's head with a trident, and his ink spells the title of the episode and the opening credits.

This sequence is a reference to the novel The Shadow over Innsmouth by H. P. Lovecraft.

Intrusion of the Pod-y Switchers
The segment begins at the underwater base of Mapple, where Steve Mobbs (on a screen) tells about the new Myphone and the new unfunny version of himself to an excited audience. When everyone is on their phone, the unfunny Steve is revealed to be a plant alien on a mission. Now on the plant planet, they shoot spores to Earth (going right next to the Futurama ship with a cloth saying "BRING BACK FUTURAMA" and then getting blown up by The Orville). In Springfield, everyone turns into plant versions of themselves. The transformed citizens are transported to a utopian plant planet with no technology. The Plant People see the citizens with pods (Mapple products) and ask where they found those. Bart says they found it under the living Christmas tree.

Multiplisa-ty
After a sleepover at Milhouse's, he, Nelson, and Bart find themselves in a cell, trapped by Lisa, suffering from dissociative identity disorder (similar to James McAvoy's character from Split), who closes them in again after they do not ask for an encore on her performance.

During a series of personality changes, Lisa attacks and kills Nelson, and transforms Milhouse into a "paper boy" before telling Bart what he did to anger her: Bart grabbed Lisa's spelling test, changing her answers, mocking Miss Hoover and granting her a F. Lisa has a last change and gives Bart a last chance to save himself and he apologizes and pledges his brotherly love for her, saving himself from being killed by trash. Returning to her normal self, Lisa confesses to Marge, admitting that the lack of affection she had received caused her to snap, and Marge admits she sympathizes with Lisa, revealing that she locked Homer in the trunk of her car for forgetting their anniversary.

Geriatric Park
In a parody of Jurassic Park, Mr. Burns opens up a Jurassic-themed retirement home, a park filled with elders rejuvenated mixing their DNA with dinosaurs. He brings Springfielders to the park, showing them the new "retirement home". At first they are all human, healthy and feeling young again, with incredible strength too. Once Homer raises the temperature after Grandpa complains about the temperature being too cold with Homer also quoting "I can't read, I'm on vacation" after seeing the warning sign, they transform into dinosaur versions of themselves.

Visitors and Mr. Burns are killed by the elders, Agnes Skinner as a Ludodactylus eats off Principal Skinner's arm, Jasper as a Dilophosaurus bites off Kirk Van Houten's head, and the Simpson family are threatened by Grandpa and Jacqueline Bouvier (turned into an Indominus rex-like theropod and a Parasaurolophus respectively). Lisa courageously confronts Grandpa and find out they all just needed to be cherished and respected. In the end, the Simpson family escape alive and unharmed, though their helicopter is being flown on the back of the transformed Agnes.

Reception
Tony Sokol of Den of Geek gave the episode 3 out of 5 points ranking, stating "Ultimately this is a disappointing Halloween installment, not horrifyingly though. We rely on The Simpsons''' 'Treehouse of Horror' stories to be the high point of any season. They have consistently been immediate classics. But "XXIX" is only lukewarm. The series has been edging closer to the "clever" side of humor over the irreverently silly, and the laughs are increasingly muted. This episode hosts some of the largest creatures of the world of terror, dinosaurs and Cthulhu. It's a shame the laughs aren't bigger.

Dennis Perkins of The A.V. Club gave the episode a C+ ranking, stating "It’s tempting after a dully serviceable outing like this to say it’s time to bury the ‘Treehouse of Horror’ concept as an unnecessary annual disappointment. But then you’d have to say that of the series itself, which, okay, some of you do. I’d maintain that The Simpsons’ decades-long role as pop cultural ‘not as good as it used to be’ punching bag could be reversed with some new creative blood in the form of those writers raised on The Simpsons who want nothing better than to jolt the lumbering comedy behemoth back to life. But, as the show plods on, it seems that that’s the one thing those in charge of the shambling enterprise are truly afraid of."

Jess Scheden of IGN'' gave the episode a 5.6 out of 10 points ranking, stating "It almost never feels like there's enough room for the writers to really take advantage of these horror parodies. The result is a lot of easy, surface level gags. More and more I find myself wondering if the series would be better off switching to an hour-long format or, better yet, devoting the entire special to one story."

“Treehouse of Horror XXIX” scored a 1.3 rating with a 6 share and was watched by 2.95 million viewers, making “The Simpsons” Fox’s highest rated show of the night.

References

External links
 

2018 American television episodes
The Simpsons (season 30) episodes
Treehouse of Horror
Cthulhu Mythos short stories
Halloween television episodes
Cultural depictions of Steve Jobs
Works based on Jurassic Park
Television episodes about dinosaurs
Television episodes about alien invasion
Television episodes about dissociative identity disorder
Works about Apple Inc.
Television episodes set in amusement parks
Television episodes directed by Matthew Faughnan